Siti Roziana binti Zain (born 2 May 1968) is a Malaysian pop singer and actress. Her music career began in the early '90s with her signature single, "Madah Berhelah" followed by hits like "Terlerai Kasih", "Setia Ku Di Sini" and "Puncak Kasih". In 1995, she was crowned Voice of Asia in Kazakhstan.

Career

1990–1992 
Ziana Zain signed a contract to record an album under BMG Asia Pacific (which has now become BMG Music). In 1991, she released her debut album Madah Berhelah and the hits single is "Madah Berhelah". It is a song about a jilted lover who was deceived by empty promises delivered through poetry and sweet words. Her subsequent singles from the same album, Riwayat Cinta, Dalam Kesakitan ini and Rentak Hidupku totally sealed her place as a singer who has powerful voice with wide octave range.

1993–1997 
Ziana's second album, Ziana Zain was released in 1993 and sold more than 85,000 copies. The album featured one foreign language track, "Chitose Bashi". The singles of the album included "Anggapanmu" and "Putus Terpaksa".

Her third album, Setia Ku Di Sini was released later in 1995 and she worked very closely with local composers. The album was certified 3× Platinum by RIM with 175,000 copies being sold. The album garnered her the "Best Female Vocalist in an Album" award at 1996's Anugerah Industri Muzik award. Ziana released five singles from the album and the lead single, "Kemelut Di Muara Kasih", was another commercial success. Four other singles, "Bersama Akhirnya", "Setia Ku Di Sini", "Sangkar Cinta" and "Tiada Kepastian" and the famous track on the album is Tuduhan and Antara Ikhlas dan Paksa went to top significant charts across Malaysia, Indonesia, Singapore and Brunei. The song "Bersama Akhirnya" garnered her the Best Solo Performance award in Pujaan 10 Nescafe.

Ziana released her fourth album, Puncak Kasih, on 28 May 1997. It won Best Pop Album in 1998's Anugerah Industri Muzik. The lead single of the album, "Puncak Kasih", was a success. It managed to stay at No. 1 in Carta Muzik Muzik for 15 consecutive weeks. The song also won Best Ballad Song in 1998's Anugerah Juara Lagu.
The other single is Satu Detik, Kalau Mencari Teman and Ada Cinta. The Music Video Ada Cinta is shotting at car park in K.L.

1998–2004 
Her comeback album was released in 2001 right after her pregnancy. The album, Aku Cintakan Mu, sold more than 20,000 copies. The album won Best Album category in 2002's Anugerah Planet Muzik. The album received a nomination for "Best Female Vocalist in an Album" in 2002's Anugerah Industri Muzik. The album's lead single, "Menadah Gerimis", won Best Ballad Song category in 2002's Anugerah Juara Lagu award. It also won Best Song in Anugerah Planet Muzik that year, apart from being voted as the Best Pop Song Choice award in Anugerah Era. Two other singles from the album were released, namely "Bagai Gahara" and "Terkenang Jua". Both of the singles did not make it to the final round in Anugerah Juara Lagu. This album was Ziana's last studio album with BMG label.

Career break: 2005–2008 
After the release of the album, Ziana took a career break for four years without releasing any studio albums.

2008–2011 

She released a mini album in 2008 entitled Dingin. The album featured four tracks and was nominated for Best Pop Song category in 2008's Anugerah Industri Muzik award. The song also managed to get into the final round of 2008's Anugerah Juara Lagu in Best Ballad Song category. However, it was lost to Faizal Tahir's "Sampai Syurga".

In February 2009, it was confirmed that Ziana was pregnant with twins. She gave birth to twins, a boy and a girl on 23 July 2009 in Shah Alam.

In January 2010, after six months of absence, finally Ziana returned to public as a surprise guest in the second annual gathering of Murai.com to celebrate the launching of a new fashion segment, Stailista, in the web portal. In that event, she stated that she would release two new singles from her upcoming untitled album. The singles, Pawana and Dirimu Satu, were expected to be released in June 2010.

Furthermore, Ziana was one of the mentors in the fourth season of a singing competition called, Mentor. As the singing competition ended in July 2010, Ziana and her protégé, Mohd were announced as the winner for that season. With that success, they managed to take home RM 100 000 and a trophy.

For her acting career, Ziana appeared in her new film, Magika, which was directed by Edry KRU. During the preview of the film, Ziana received positive reviews on her excellent acting.

In addition, taking place in Cititel Hotel, Kuala Lumpur, Ziana Zain had been announced as a spokesperson for Slimworld Beauty House. This was the seventh years she was appointed as the ambassador of the beauty house.

Apart from singing, acting and being product ambassador, Ziana is also involved in theatrical performance. Together with fellow singer Misha Omar, she was cast in the second season of a musical theatre production entitled Teater Muzikal Gamat 2. The performance, which commenced on 12 March 2010, was held in the Auditorium of Malaysian Tourism Centre (MaTiC), Kuala Lumpur, for 11 consecutive days. This was Ziana's second participation in theatre after Musical Theater Antara.

In 2011, Ziana Zain made some controversial remarks on Malaysian artist associations where she said the participation of Malaysian celebrities in these associations is just a waste of time. According to her, associations such as the Artists Association of Malaysia (Seniman), Karyawan Association (Karyawan) and Papita only serve the interests of a selected few and therefore should be disbanded.

2012-Present 
In April 2014, Zain announced her solo concert, I Am Ziana Zain will be held in September 2014. The concert was scheduled to be held at her home state, Malacca International Trade Centre. This will be her first solo concert after 15 years. Unfortunately, due to "organizer's internal problems" the concert was cancelled.

On 15 July 2014, Zain stepped out in a new look, wearing full hijab with the approval of media outlets and fans. Zain also revealed in an interview that her upcoming album is in the works. She is working with Faizal Tahir and Awi Rafael for the new album.

Asian Music Exposure 
 1989 – Sang one of the soundtrack of 15th Southeast Asia (SEA) Games
 1992 – Selected to sing Japanese popular song, Chitose Bashi in an album Asian Voices
 1993 – Recorded 2 English songs in Colors of Love, album involving 5 best Asian Singer
 1993 – Performed in Asia Pop Queen Festival that held in Hiroshima and Fukuoka Japan
 1995 – Won main award in Voice of Asia, Kazakhstan
 1995 – Performed in Asia Live konsert, aired over Japan's NHK satellite TV Channel Two
 1996 – Won Golden Melody Award in Japan Music Festival, Japan
 1996 – Recorded 2 Disney's songs in an album called A Musical Salute to Disney
 1996 – Involved in Musical Program, The Big Show in Singapore
 1997 – Invited to OMEGA International Celebrity Club in Crans Montana, Switzerland
 1997 – Performed in Asian Music Scene
 1998 – Performed live during Opening 16th Commonwealth Games with the song Strive for the Best
 2002 – Invited to St Moritz, Switzerland for her 6th appointment of OMEGA ambassador
 2003 – Invited to Auckland, New Zealand, for OMEGA Seamaster watch launching
 2007 – Invited to Beijing, China for FENDI Summer Fashion Show
 2010 – Invited to Australia for Photo-shoot with Louis Vuitton products.

In 20 years in the music industry, she has collaborated with many celebrities, including Jim Brickman, Cindy Crawford, Anna Kournikova, Kate Bosworth, Shah Rukh Khan, and Ralf Schumacher.

Discography

Studio albums

Compilations 
 Koleksi Khas
 Best of Ziana Zain
 Ziana Zain's Choice
 Ratu – Satu Penghargaan
 Keunggulan Ziana Zain
 The Essentials

Live albums 
 Ziana Zain Unplugged
 Ziana Zain No. 1s Live

Films Soundtracks 
 Sembilu
 Sembilu II
 Maria Mariana
 Merah
 Maria Mariana II
 Pontian Menjerik
 Sembilu 2005
 Kabhi Khusry Kabhi Igam
 Magika

Karaoke/VCDs 
 Konsert Zon Perlindungan Ziana Zain
 The Best of Ziana Zain
 Balada Hits Karaoke Ziana Zain
 Karaoke Bersama Ziana Zain
 Ziana Zain Lembah Asmara: A Beautiful Love Story
 Keunggulan Ziana Zain VCD Karaoke

Concerts 
 1996: Ziana Zain Unplugged Concert (Life Centre, Kuala Lumpur)
 1998: Ziana Zain Mega Tour Concert, Peter Stuyvesant ( Malaysia, Singapore and Brunei)
 1999: Ziana Zain: Konsert Zon Perlindungan Head & Shoulders (PWTC, Kuala Lumpur)
 2001: ZZ in the Park (PWTC, Kuala Lumpur)
 2002: Ziana Zain Unplugged Concert (Jerudong Park Amphitheatre, Brunei)
 2022: Anuar Zain & Ziana Zain Live In Kuala Lumpur 2022 (Plenary Hall, Kuala Lumpur City Centre Kuala Lumpur)

Acting career 

In addition to her music career, Ziana also diverted her focus into acting. Her acting career transpired when she was approached by Dato' Yusof Haslam. She agreed to appear in his film Sembilu, as a supporting actress with the role "Ziana". The film marked her debut as an actress. It was a successful box-office, grossing RM4.2 million. The film also helped Ziana establish herself as a successful actress, especially after winning the Most Popular Supporting Actress category in 1994's Anugerah Bintang Popular Awards, alongside her co-star Erra Fazira who was catapulted into fame after her debut appearance through this film. The film's soundtrack also featured a number of Ziana's songs including "Ku Cinta Padamu", "Anggapanmu" and "Mimpimu Bukan Mimpiku". In the 1996 Sembilu follow-up, Sembilu II, Ziana reprised her role to critical claim.

Other box-office films that Ziana has performed include Maria Mariana (1996), Merah (1997), Maria Mariana II (1998), Sembilu 2005 (2005), Pontianak Menjerit (2005), and Qabil Khusry Qabil Igam (2007). Besides acting in film, Ziana also appeared in television dramas. Her first drama acting was directed by Erma Fatima entitled Cermin Pada Bulan. Ziana was the leading actress in the drama and her performance in the drama generally received notable compliments. In 2007, Ziana varied her acting skill by accepting a role in a comedy drama entitled 4 Diva Sekampung, which is about four divas who get stuck in their way back to their hometown because of their van's breakdown. The drama was screened during Hari Raya. Ziana also appeared as a leading actress in Tetamu Allah as well as her latest drama which is Nur Kasih di Jabal Rahmah. Both dramas were directed by Erma Fatima.

Products and endorsements 
After almost 20 years in the music industry, Zian had been chosen as spokesperson by many international and local products. Recently, Ziana and her family were appointed as spokesperson for a hygiene product, Antabax. This was the 11th product that has appointed Ziana as their spokesperson. Besides antabax, she has shilled:
 1996 – Avon
 1997 – NutriBeaute
 1997 – Omega timepieces
 1999 – B&H Health Products
 1999 – Head & Shoulders Shampoo
 2001 – Vono Mattress
 2003 – Brilliant Rose
 2003 – L'Oreal
 2004 – Slim World Beauty House
 2004 – Nutrimetics Cosmetics and Skincare
 2010 – Antabax

In 2005, Ziana became the first Malaysian artist to release her own perfume, "Truly", which was distributed by Nutrimetics company. In addition, Ziana Zain has been an endorser of the product VONO Mattress for 10 years.

Awards and accolades

Filmography

Film

Telemovie

Television series

Musical Theatre

Television shows

References

External links 

 

 
1968 births
Living people
Malaysian people of Malay descent
Malaysian actresses
Malaysian female models
Malaysian women pop singers
Mezzo-sopranos
Malaysian television personalities
Malay-language singers
Malaysian people of Bugis descent
KRU Studios contract players
Malaysian world music singers